Samuel Albert McMichael (18 July 1869 – 21 April 1923) was an Australian first-class cricketer who represented Victoria in the Sheffield Shield. He also played Australian rules football with Fitzroy in the Victorian Football League (VFL).

Cricket
McMichael played his cricket as a specialist batsman, scoring six half centuries for Victoria. His highest score of 97 was made in a match against South Australia at the Melbourne Cricket Ground. He had a long career with the East Melbourne Cricket Club, scoring more than 5000 runs with a highest score of 246 not out. He was also the club's secretary, credited with restoring the club's finances at a difficult time. He also managed the Victorian team; in March 1903, while managing the team during a match in Brisbane, he saved a lady in the grandstand from injury when he caught a six inches from her face.

Football
In addition to his cricket career, and in addition to playing for both Fitzroy in the VFA, and for a (VFA) Victorian team against South Australia, he played ten games for Fitzroy during the 1897 inaugural VFL season, including Fitzroy's first ever game in the league.

Sports journalism
He also wrote for some years for the Sydney sports weekly, The Referee, under the nom de plume "The Onlooker".

See also
 List of Victoria first-class cricketers

References 

 Manning, E.B., "A Sportsman and a Man: Appreciation of the Late Mr. Sam McMichael", The Referee, (Wednesday, 2 May 1923), p.13.

External links 
 
 

1869 births
1923 deaths
Australian cricketers
Victoria cricketers
People from Clifton Hill, Victoria
Fitzroy Football Club players
Australian rules footballers from Melbourne
Cricketers from Melbourne
Australian sports journalists